is a Japanese actress and singer.

She appeared in the 2009 live action film Yatterman as Yatterman 2 "Ai-chan."

Filmography

Film

Television

Anime
Crayon Shin Chan (2008) (Ep. 648)

Awards
54th Television Drama Academy Awards: Best Supporting Actress for LIFE

References

External links
 Official Website
 Official Blog
 
 

1990 births
Living people
Japanese voice actresses
Japanese women pop singers
Japanese television personalities
People from Kumamoto
21st-century Japanese actresses
Voice actresses from Kumamoto Prefecture
Musicians from Kumamoto Prefecture
Oscar Promotion artists
21st-century Japanese singers
21st-century Japanese women singers